Bobby Schagen (born 13 January 1990) is a Dutch handball player for TBV Lemgo and the Dutch national team.

He represented the Netherlands at the 2020 European Men's Handball Championship.

References

External links

1990 births
Living people
Dutch male handball players
Sportspeople from Amsterdam
Expatriate handball players
Dutch expatriate sportspeople in Germany
Handball-Bundesliga players